Veprecula vepratica is a species of sea snail, a marine gastropod mollusk in the family Raphitomidae.

Description
The length of the shell varies between 3.5 mm and 12 mm.

(Original description) The small, thin, slender shell is fusiform and prickly. The spire is pagodiform. Its colour is uniform pale brown. The shell contains six whorls, plus a five-whorled embryonic protoconch. 

Sculpture: except the prickles and the ridges, the whole surface is microscopically granulated. Ten sharp projecting radial ribs, interrupted by the broad anal fasciole, ascend the spire obliquely. Along the periphery of each whorl runs a
broad spiral shelf, beneath it are two similar but lesser spirals, the lowest of which is half buried in the suture, and above it are three rapidly and successively diminishing spirals. These radials and spirals enclose deeply sunk lozenges, at the point of intersection upwardly directed prickles arise. The anal fasciole is marked with crescentic striae. On the base and siphonal canal are a dozen spiral threads. 

The apex of five whorls is sharply differentiated from the adult shell, sculptured with close delicate, crenulate, radial riblets. Slit sutural, broad and deep. The aperture is pyriform, narrowing gradually to the siphonal canal. The outer lip is sharp. There is no callus on the columella. The siphonal canal is very long, open and sinuate.

Distribution
This marine species occurs in the Persian Gulf and off Japan; off New South Wales, Australia.

References

 Laseron, C. 1954. Revision of the New South Wales Turridae (Mollusca). Australian Zoological Handbook. Sydney : Royal Zoological Society of New South Wales pp. 56, pls 1–12. 
 Powell, A.W.B. 1966. The molluscan families Speightiidae and Turridae, an evaluation of the valid taxa, both Recent and fossil, with list of characteristic species. Bulletin of the Auckland Institute and Museum. Auckland, New Zealand 5: 1–184, pls 1–23

External links
 MNHN, Paris: specimen
  Melvill J.C. (1917). A revision of the Turridae (Pleurotomidae) occurring in the Persian Gulf, Gulf of Oman, and North Arabian Sea, as evidenced mostly through the results of dredgings carried out by Mr. F. W. Townsend, 1893–1914. Proceedings of the Malacological Society of London. 12(4): 140-186, pls 8-10
 
 Gastropods.com: Veprecula vepratica
 

vepratica
Molluscs of the Indian Ocean
Molluscs of the Pacific Ocean
Gastropods of Australia
Gastropods described in 1903
Taxa named by Charles Hedley